Pêche is French for "fishing" or "peach".

Peche or Pêche may refer to :

Places
 Peche Island, an uninhabited Canadian-owned river island, located at the northern end of the Detroit River
 Peche River, a river located in Afghanistan
 La Pêche, Quebec, a municipality along both sides of the Gatineau River, Canada
 La Pêche Lake, a lake in western Quebec, Canada
 La Pêche River, a river in western Quebec which flows from La Pêche Lake (Lac La Pêche), Canada
 Lac La Peche, Saskatchewan, Canada

People
 Matthieu Péché (born 1987), French slalom canoeist
 Robert Peche, a medieval Bishop of Coventry from 1121 to 1128
 Richard Peche, a medieval Bishop of Coventry, probably the son of Robert Peche
 John Peche, a Lord Warden of the Cinque Ports from 1323 to 1325
 Peche Di, a transgender model, dancer, actress, videographer, and modeling agent

See also
 Pech (disambiguation)